Sreejith Ravi (born 19 May 1976) is an Indian actor who appears predominantly in Malayalam films and also in Tamil films. He is the son of actor T. G. Ravi.

Early life
Sreejith is the son of actor and industrialist T. G. Ravi and V. K. Subhadra. He studied in Hari Sri Vidya Nidhi School, Thrissur. He received his Bachelor of Engineering in Mechanical Engineering from the National Institute of Technology Karnataka. He also received his PGDBA from ICFAI Business School, Bangalore, and Diploma in Business Finance from ICFAI Hyderabad.

Career
He started his acting career in 2005 with the film Mayookham. He got a breakthrough after appearing in Chanthupottu. He also acted in Adoor Gopalakrishnan's Naalu Pennungal. He portrayed Sivarasan in the Rajiv Gandhi assassination-based Mission 90 Days. he had a substantial role in Chekavar. he debuted in Tamil film industry with Vettai. His roles in Sathyan Anthikad's Kadha Thudarunnu and Orkut Oru Ormakoot was different from the villains role he did until then.

He won SIIMA award in 2013 for the Best Comedian for his performance in Punyalan Agarbattis, in which he played a humorous role named Abhayakumar, an auto-rickshaw driver. He played main villain characters in the Tamil films Kumki, Madha Yaanai Koottam, Kathakali (film). He has acted in a Kannada film Happily Married. He also has dubbed for his father T. G. Ravi in Ashwaroodan and Pranchiyettan & the Saint.

Personal life
Sreejith is married to Sajitha Sreejith and has two sons—Rijrashwa Sreejith and Ritunjay Sreejith.

Filmography

All films are in Malayalam language unless otherwise noted

As dubbing artist
 Pranchiyettan and the Saint  - voice for T.G Ravi
 Ashwaroodan- voice for T.G Ravi

Arrest and release 
He was arrested in 2016 for public indecency, where he flashed 14 schoolgirls in Palakkad, though he was released on bail. He was again arrested in July 2022 for flashing naked in front of two minors. He was denied bail and was remanded for seven days. The court, considering that he was undergoing treatment for a behavioural disorder for the past six years, was granted bail on condition that the bail would get cancelled if he was found guilty of similar offenses again.

References

External links

 
 http://popcorn.oneindia.in/artist/9423/1/sreejith-ravi.html
 http://www.brahmacreations.org/sreejith-ravi-emerging-heights-kadavul-shaju-malayalam-movie-kerala-today/

Male actors in Malayalam cinema
Indian male film actors
1976 births
People from Thrissur
Male actors from Thrissur
Living people
21st-century Indian male actors
Hari Sri Vidya Nidhi School alumni